Frenzy is a 1972 film directed by Alfred Hitchcock

Frenzy may also refer to:

Rage (emotion), a feeling of intense anger

Books and comics
Frenzy, a 1997 novel by Percival Everett
Frenzy, a 1988 novel by Rex Miller
Frenzy, a 2010 novel by Robert Liparulo
Frenzy, a 2014 novel by John Lutz
The Frenzy, a 2010 novel by Francesca Lia Block
Joanna Cargill, a Marvel Comics supervillain also known as Frenzy

Film and television
Frenzy (1939 film), an Italian comedy film
Torment (1944 film), a 1944 Swedish film written by Ingmar Bergman, also known as Frenzy
Frenzy (2015 film), a Turkish film
Frenzy, a 1960s film by Alfred Hitchcock which was never completed
Frenzy (Transformers), a character from the Transformers universe

Music
Frenzy (Split Enz album), 1979
Frenzy (Mojo Nixon album), 1986
Frenzy (High Inergy album), 1979
"Frenzy", a 1957 song by Screamin' Jay Hawkins

Video games
Frenzy (1982 video game), an arcade game manufactured by Stern in 1982
Frenzy (1984 video game), a computer game published by Micro Power in 1984

See also

Frantic (disambiguation)
Frenetic (disambiguation)